This is a survey of the postage stamps and postal history of the Wallis and Futuna Islands.

The Wallis and Futuna Islands are a Polynesian French island territory in the South Pacific between Tuvalu to the northwest, Rotuma of Fiji to the west and the main part of Fiji to the southwest.

First stamps
The first stamps for the islands were overprinted stamps of New Caledonia issued in May 1920.

References

External links

France and Colonies Philatelic Society of Great Britain.
Wallis & Futuna Stamps collectors website.

History of Wallis and Futuna
Communications in Wallis and Futuna
Wallis and Futuna culture
Wallis and Futuna